Cocking is a village, parish and civil parish in the Chichester district of West Sussex, England. The village is about three miles (5 km) south of Midhurst on the main A286 road to Chichester.

In the 2001 census there were 190 households in the civil parish with a total population of 459 of whom 223 were economically active. In 2011, the population was 420.

History and notable buildings
Cocking (Cochinges) was listed in the Domesday Book (1086) in the ancient hundred of Easebourne as having 32 households: 18 cottagers, eight smallholders and six slaves; with ploughing land, five mills and a church, it had a value to the lord of the manor of £15.

The 11th century Anglican parish church had no known dedication until 2007 when it was dedicated to St. Catherine of Siena. There was a Congregational Chapel in Crypt Lane, founded in 1806 and rebuilt in 1907, which is now a private house.

In the centre of the village, on the corner of Mill Lane, stands the old school, now a private residence. This was built in 1870 to the designs of architects Richard Carpenter and William Slater. The school has Gothic-style windows and door arches, is faced in flint, and has a red-tiled roof and decorative barge-boards to the gables. The former schoolmaster's house has a distinctive chimney-stack with four outlets.

To the south of the village are the remains of Cocking Lime Works, abandoned in 1999, and the associated chalk pit. To the north are a few traces of the Chorley Iron Foundry, which cast the waterwheels now at the Weald and Downland Open Air Museum and at the Coultershaw Beam Pump.

There still remain in the village some houses of 17th century origin. In 1931 the population of the village was 431.

There was a Richard Cobden pub in Cocking which closed and became a private residence in the 20th century. Richard Cobden lived in nearby Heyshott.

Transport
A railway once used to serve the area at Cocking Station, on the Chichester to Midhurst line opened in 1881, but was completely closed from 1953. The village is on the Stagecoach South No.60 bus route which runs from Midhurst to Chichester.

Today
A number of buildings in the village belong to the Cowdray Estate, distinguished by their external woodwork painted yellow.

The remaining village pub, formerly The Blue Bell, became a restaurant with accommodation called The Bluebell Inn, and stands on the corner of Bell Lane.

Cocking is on the South Downs Way long-distance footpath.

References

External links

  Village website
 Further historical information and sources on GENUKI
 Detailed history and sources at British History Online

Villages in West Sussex
Chichester District